Malesherbes is a former commune in the Loiret department in north-central France. On 1 January 2016, it was merged into the new commune of Le Malesherbois. It is 65 kilometers away from Orléans.

The terminus of the RER D is located in the commune.

Notable people
Chrétien Guillaume de Lamoignon de Malesherbes (1721-1794), magistrate, lawyer and French statesman. He lived in the Castle of Malesherbes.
Eugène-Louis Hauvette-Besnault, Indologist, was born and died in Malesherbes.

See also
Communes of the Loiret department

References

Former communes of Loiret